Mohamed Omar Arte is a Somali politician. He is the former Vice President of Somalia.

Personal life
Arte hails from the Sa'ad Musa sub-division of the Habr Awal Isaaq clan. He is the son of former Prime Minister of Somalia Umar Arteh Ghalib.

Vice President of Somalia

Appointment
On 12 January 2015, Arte was appointed Deputy Prime Minister by Prime Minister Omar Abdirashid Ali Sharmarke. On the 17 January 2015, Prime Minister Sharmarke dissolved his newly nominated cabinet due to vehement opposition by legislators, who rejected the reappointment of certain former ministers. On 27 January 2015, Sharmarke appointed a new, smaller 20 minister Cabinet of which Mohamed Omar Arte was again named Vice President of Somalia  of Somalia. This time, he was concurrently named Minister of Labor, Youth and Sports. On 6 February, Sharmarke finalized his cabinet, consisting of 26 ministers, 14 state ministers, and 26 deputy ministers of which Mohamed Omar Arte now held the sole post of Vice President of Somalia . He has now been succeeded by Mahdi Ahmed Guled.

Anti-terrorism law
In May 2015, Vice President of Somalia Arte chaired a Federal Cabinet meeting, his first since being lightly wounded during an Al-Shabaab attack on the Central Hotel in Mogadishu in February of the year. The Council of Ministers therein passed an anti-terrorism law. The bill had earlier been approved by the federal ministers, but was subsequently repealed by lawmakers who called for amendments to the legislation. It is part of the government's broader strategy against Al-Shabaab and other anti-peace elements. The law aims to strengthen national security by more effectively countering radicalization and rooting out extremism. It is now slated to be put before parliament for deliberation.

References

Living people
Government ministers of Somalia
Year of birth missing (living people)